Mimi is a 2021 Nigerian romantic comedy film written and directed by Samuel Olatunji. The film stars Ireti Doyle, Toyin Abraham, Bimbo Akintola in the lead roles. It became the first Nollywood film ever to have had its premiere at a beach when it was premiered at the Wave Beach in Elegushi on 13 May 2021. The film had its theatrical release on 14 May 2021.

Cast 
Bianca Ugowanne
 Ireti Doyle
 Toyin Abraham
 Prince Jide Kosoko
 Deyemi Okanlawon
 Olaniyi Afonja
 Afeez Oyetoro
 Bimbo Akintola
 Lateef Adedimeji
 Stephanie Isuma
 Omotunde David

Synopsis 
Mimi, a daughter of a rich millionaire discovers that her rich parents are not her actual biological parents and realises that her original parents live in poverty and sold her in order to raise funds to manage the cost of living. Her rich parents who adapted her during her young age then make arrangements for Mimi to spend a two-week vacation with her original parents.

Production 
The film project marked the second collaboration between director Samuel Olatunji and CEO of AUL Media Studios, Edward Dickinson after Dear Affy. It also marked the third collaboration between 007 Global, AUL Media Studios and SBG Film Production after Street Kid and Dear Affy.

Release 

The film was initially taunted to be released on 25 December 2020 coinciding with Christmas but was postponed due to the COVID-19 pandemic. The film had its special premiere during the Movie and music concert at the Wave Beach in Lagos on 13 May 2021, a day prior to the scheduled theatrical release. The film was released on 14 May 2021 and was screened in over 60 cinemas nationwide.

References 

2021 films
Nigerian romantic comedy films
2021 romantic comedy films
English-language Nigerian films
2020s English-language films